15th TFCA Awards
December 14, 2011

Best Film: 
 The Tree of Life 
The 15th Toronto Film Critics Association Awards, honoring the best in film for 2011, were given on December 14, 2011.

Winners
Best Actor:
Michael Shannon – Take Shelter 
Runners-Up: George Clooney – The Descendants and Michael Fassbender – Shame

Best Actress:
Michelle Williams – My Week with Marilyn
Runners-Up: Elizabeth Olsen – Martha Marcy May Marlene and Meryl Streep – The Iron Lady

Best Animated Film: 
The Adventures of Tintin
Runners-Up: Puss in Boots and Rango

Best Director: 
Terrence Malick – The Tree of Life 
Runners-Up: Michel Hazanavicius – The Artist and Nicolas Winding Refn – Drive

Best Documentary Film: 
Nostalgia for the Light
Runners-Up: Into the Abyss and Project Nim

Best Film:
The Tree of Life
Runners-Up: The Artist and The Descendants

Best First Feature: 
Attack the Block
Runners-Up: Margin Call and Martha Marcy May Marlene

Best Foreign Language Film: 
Mysteries of Lisbon • Portugal
Runners-Up: Attenberg • Greece, Le Havre • Finland and A Separation • Iran

Best Screenplay:
Moneyball – Steven Zaillian and Aaron Sorkin 
Runners-Up: The Descendants – Alexander Payne, Nat Faxon and Jim Rash and The Tree of Life – Terrence Malick

Best Supporting Actor:
Christopher Plummer – Beginners
Runners-Up: Albert Brooks – Drive and Patton Oswalt – Young Adult

Best Supporting Actress:
Jessica Chastain – Take Shelter 
Runners-Up: Jessica Chastain – The Tree of Life and Shailene Woodley – The Descendants

Rogers Canadian Film Award:
Monsieur Lazhar
Runners-Up: Café de Flore and A Dangerous Method

References
 “The Tree of Life” Named Best Picture of 2011 torontofilmcritics.com

2011
2011 film awards
2011 in Toronto
2011 in Canadian cinema